Kurkino is a rural locality (a village) in Kubenskoye Rural Settlement, Vologodsky District, Vologda Oblast, Russia. The population was 1,002 as of 2002. There are 13 streets.

Geography 
The distance to Vologda is 29 km, to Mayskoye is 13 km. Megleyevo, Kolbino are the nearest rural localities.

References 

Rural localities in Vologodsky District